Dutuheh-ye Sofla (also Romanized as Dūtūheh-ye Soflá and Dūtūyeh-ye Soflá; also known as Dowpūyeh-ye Pā’īn, Do Tūyeh, Do Tūyeh-ye Pā’īn, Dotūyeh-ye Pā’īn, and Dūtuyeh Pāīn) is a village in Kahrizak Rural District, Kahrizak District, Ray County, Tehran Province, Iran. At the 2006 census, its population was 867, in 212 families.

References 

Populated places in Ray County, Iran